Parudeesa (Paradise) is a 2012 Malayalam–language Indian feature film written by Vinu Abraham and directed by national award-winning filmmaker R. Sarath. The film stars Sreenivasan, Thampy Antony and Swetha Menon in the lead roles. Like in his previous films, Sarath interweaves a complex theme in Parudeesa—that of conflict of belief, the perpetual disagreement between orthodox and unorthodox paths of religion. The film, set against the backdrop of a remote hillside hamlet, unravels the story of a priest and a verger. While the priest is still lost in the labyrinth of orthodoxy, verger has a very liberated outlook about religion, or rather life in general. The film captures the quintessential conflict flickered by the situation. Sreenivasan plays the Bishop while Thampy Antony appears as the Priest and Swetha Menon plays the role of a cook at the nearby convent. Noted comedian and actor Jagathy Sreekumar plays another full-length character, Parudeesa being the last film he completed before the accident. The film released on 26 October 2012 and met with a mixed reaction. Reviews among major critics and parallel movie buffs have been positive but most online critics of mainstream cinema have given the film negative reviews.

The film became controversial for inciting the clergymen in the film. In reply to the controversies created, Sarath said: "It’s a baseless allegation that the film instigates an anti-religious propaganda. In fact Parudeesa is a film that glorifies Christ. It makes a jibe at the situation where religion supersedes everything else, even god. From the progressive ideologies of 60s and 70s we are going back to the perils of theocracy. The film attacks superstitions and regression from a pointblank position." Vinu Abraham Vinu Abraham says in a sense Parudeesa attempts to define faith. "We are trying to tell that despite all its external rigidity, religion, at its core, should be a progressive forum," says Vinu.

Parudeesa was produced by Thampy Antony under the banner of Kayal Films. It was mainly shot in Erumapra near Erattupetta and Vinu Abraham says it was more like a miracle to find the exact locale he visualised for the film. "We wanted a church that stands high on a mountainous terrain and got this ancient church that was established more than a century back by the missionaries. It was the first time a movie camera entered its premises," he says. Two national award-winning musicians composed music for the film. The film's background score is by Issac Thomas Kottukapally while the songs are composed by Ouseppachan. Thampi Antony who is acting in as well as producing the film pens a song in the film. The song starting with the lines, "Yathra Chodikkunnu", is sung by Vijay Yesudas.

Plot
Parudeesa tells the story of a Catholic parish in a hillside village in Kerala. Set in two milieus – Kerala of the sixties and seventies and that of the eighties and nineties – the film unfolds through the conflict of ideals between Bishop Aanjalithanam, an orthodox Bishop, who is the last word in the parish, and a firebrand Priest named Jose, who believes that Christ was the original revolutionary. Both of them believe that their way to God is the true path, the only path.

As he sets out to bring a change in society, increasingly Father Jose finds himself facing opposition at every turn, and that's not only from Bishop Aanjalithanam but from within the parish and the extended village community too. The catalyst for the conflict is feisty Theresia, an umarried maid who works in the kitchen of a nearby convent. Jagathy Sreekumar also has an important role in the film, as the powerful secretary of the church committee.

Cast
 Sreenivasan as Bishop Aanjalithanam
 Thampy Antony as Father Jose
 Swetha Menon as Theresia
 Jagathy Sreekumar as Authachan
Nandhu as the rubber tapper
 Indrans
 Ambika Mohan as Authachan's wife

Reception
The film received mixed reviews upon release. Reviews among major critics and parallel movie buffs have been positive but most online critics of mainstream cinema have given the film negative reviews. 

The critic of Sify.com rated the film "Below Average" and wrote, "There is a decent storyline here but the problem is the way it has been narrated. . The usual cliches of the offbeat films are there and the efforts to commercialise the presentation have ended up as a rather half-baked one." The reviewer also criticised Thampi Antony's performance stating that the actor is "evidently struggling to fit in to the role".

References

2010s Malayalam-language films
Films directed by R. Sarath
2012 drama films
2012 films
Indian drama films
Films about Christianity
Films scored by Ouseppachan